Where There's a Will is a 1936 British comedy film directed by William Beaudine and starring Will Hay, Graham Moffatt and Norma Varden. It features an incompetent solicitor who unwittingly becomes party to a bank robbery.

The film marked the first appearance of Graham Moffatt in a Will Hay film. Moffatt acted as a straight man to Hay, along with Moore Marriott, beginning in the film Windbag the Sailor.

Plot
Will Hay plays the penniless, bungling solicitor Benjamin Stubbins, who arrives at his office to find his insolent office boy (Graham Moffatt) with his feet up on the desk, reading a wild west magazine, that Hay confiscates so that he can read it later.

Stubbins later takes a job from a group of Americans who claim they want him to track down some ancestors of theirs in Scotland.  In reality, however, they want to use his office so they can rob a safe in the room immediately below his office. Stubbins takes the job (which is designed to keep him out of the office).

In the end Stubbins realises his mistake and at a Christmas Eve fancy dress party he informs a group of carol singing policeman about the Americans’ nefarious activities.

Cast

 Will Hay as Benjamin Stubbins
 Graham Moffatt as Willie the office boy
 Norma Varden as Lady Margaret Wimpleton
 Hartley Power as Duke Wilson
 Gina Malo as Goldie Kelly
 H. F. Maltby as Sir Roger Wimpleton
 Peggy Simpson as Barbara Stubbins
 Gibb McLaughlin as Martin
 Eddie Houghton as 'Slug'
 Hal Waters as 'Nick'
 John Turnbull as Detective Collins
 Sybil Brooke as the Landlady
 Davina Craig as 'Lucie'
 Mickey Brantford as 'Jimmy'
 Henry Adnes as the Pawnbroker
 Frederick Piper as a Fingerprint expert

External links
 

1936 films
1930s crime comedy films
British crime comedy films
British black-and-white films
Films directed by William Beaudine
Films produced by Michael Balcon
1936 comedy films
1930s English-language films
1930s British films